is the Governor of the Japan Bank for International Cooperation. He is a candidate to become the Governor of the Bank of Japan.

Sources
This article incorporates material in 田波耕治 (Tanami Kōji) in the Japanese Wikipedia, retrieved on March 18, 2008.

External links
Japan Bank for International Cooperation 
Nikkei report on candidacy

1939 births
Living people
People from Tokyo